Sunday Night Hockey  was a weekly presentation of National Hockey League games that air on NBCSN on Sundays during the regular season. Sunday Night Hockey usually debuts during the second Sunday of January.

The package made its debut on January 10, 2016, featuring a game between the New Jersey Devils and the Minnesota Wild. Following the game, NBCSN premiered a weekly recap show, NHL Sunday Shootout, which is a summary of the previous week's NHL action.

During the 2016–17 NHL season, NBC Sports began to promote both the Game of the Week and Sunday Night Hockey broadcasts under the Star Sunday brand, focusing primarily on the NHL's star players. Star Sunday features extensive pre-game, in-game, and post-game coverage of each featured player. The first game under the new package featured the Wild visiting the Anaheim Ducks on January 5, 2017. The game's featured players were Minnesota's Ryan Suter and Anaheim's Ryan Kesler.

Results

2015–16 season

2016–17 season

During the season, the Star Sunday brand made its debut.

(*) Designated as a Star Sunday game.

2017–18 season
NBC resumed its special Star Sunday presentations on March 11, 2018, both as part of the Game of the Week and Sunday Night Hockey package.

(*) Designated as a Star Sunday game.

2018–19 season
Star Sunday returned on February 3, 2019, both as part of the Game of the Week and Sunday Night Hockey package. This will mark the first season of Star Sunday to have its presenting sponsor; AT&T was the first presenting sponsor and they branded themselves as Star Sunday presented by AT&T.

(*) Designated as a Star Sunday game.

2019–20 season
Beginning with this season, Brian Boucher replaced Pierre McGuire on the lead broadcast team with Mike Emrick and Eddie Olczyk. McGuire will be reassigned to work with NBC's other broadcast teams.

2020–21 season
Due to the COVID-19 pandemic, the start of the 2020–21 NHL season has been delayed to January 13, 2021, and all teams will play a 56-game division-only schedule with the NHL temporairally realigning divisions to minimize travel as much as possible, with all seven Canadian teams playing one division due to COVID-19 cross-border travel restrictions imposed by the Government of Canada.

15 different teams from all four divisions will be featured on 10 Sunday Night Hockey matchups. All four teams who competed in the conference finals of the 2020 Stanley Cup playoffs will be featured on Sunday Night Hockey. Six out of the 10 Sunday Night Hockey matchups will feature a traditional Western Conference team. Unlike in previous years, a few Sunday Night Hockey games will not be exclusive and are blacked out in favor of local broadcasters.

Ratings
During its inaugural season, Sunday Night Hockey averaged 491,000 viewers over 13 games, up 28% from Sunday Night games during the 2014–15 NHL season over the same number of games (384,000). NBCSN's ten-most watched games of the 2015–16 season were either Wednesday Night Rivalry or Sunday Night Hockey games.

Notes

References

2016 American television series debuts
2021 American television series endings
2010s American television series
2020s American television series
NHL on NBC
NBC
NBCSN shows